The Weber Stake Relief Society Building is a historic building in Ogden, Utah. It was built in 1902 for the Relief Society in the Webster stake of the Church of Jesus Christ of Latter-day Saints, and it was designed in the Gothic Revival architectural style. It has been listed on the National Register of Historic Places since February 13, 1989.

References

	
National Register of Historic Places in Weber County, Utah
Gothic Revival architecture in Utah
Religious buildings and structures completed in 1902
Religious buildings and structures of the Church of Jesus Christ of Latter-day Saints in Utah
1902 establishments in Utah
Relief Society buildings
20th-century Latter Day Saint church buildings